"Don't Forbid Me" is a popular song by Charles Singleton. Among Singleton's huge number of compositions was "Tryin' to Get to You", which had previously been recorded by Elvis Presley at Sun Records.  In 1957, "Don't Forbid Me" was a number 1 hit for Pat Boone, and also peaked at number 10 on the Most Played R&B in Juke Boxes chart.

Presley connection and version
Pat Boone's recording and 1957 hit record though came about because the demo was first sent to Presley's house where it laid unopened, in Elvis' words "with all the junk that comes there". This was revealed by Presley during the Million Dollar Quartet jam session of December 4, 1956, before Boone's recording came out. Presley cut a fast minute and twenty second version of the song with The Million Dollar Quartet, that then laid lost with the other Sun Records tapes of that session for 25 years.

The Beatles and Bert Kaempfert cover versions
According to eminent author Mark Lewisohn in "The Complete Beatles Chronicles" (p. 362), The Beatles performed Don't Forbid Me on stage from at least 1960 and through 1961 (which would've been in Liverpool and Hamburg) with Paul McCartney on lead vocal. But no recording is known to survive. However their performing it on stage in Hamburg is probably where big-band conductor, arranger, writer, producer Bert Kaempfert heard the song (as he had previously never covered a single rock song of any sort for his instrumental records). Thus in 1961 the celebrated Bert Kaempfert did a version of the song for his instrumental album, The Wonderland Of Bert Kaempfert. Kaempfert also signed The Beatles to record for Polydor backing their friend (and almost Beatle) Tony Sheridan.

References

Billboard Top 100 number-one singles
1956 songs
1957 singles
Songs written by Charles Singleton (songwriter)
Pat Boone songs
Elvis Presley songs